Big Horn County School District #2 is a public school district based in Lovell, Wyoming, United States.

Geography
Big Horn County School District #2 serves the northern portion of Big Horn County as well as a very small, detached tract of land in northeastern Park County. Lovell is the only incorporated town in the district.

Schools
Lovell High School (Grades 9–12)
Lovell Middle School (Grades 6–8)
Lovell Elementary School (Grades K-5)

Student demographics
The following figures are as of October 1, 2009.

Total District Enrollment: 660
Student enrollment by gender
Male: 323 (48.94%)
Female: 337 (51.06%)
Student enrollment by ethnicity
American Indian or Alaska Native: 6 (0.91%)
Asian: 6 (0.91%)
Hispanic or Latino: 61 (9.24%)
White: 587 (88.94%)

See also
List of school districts in Wyoming

References

External links
Big Horn County School District #2 – official site.

Education in Big Horn County, Wyoming
Education in Park County, Wyoming
School districts in Wyoming